Shakil Ahmed is a Bangladeshi sports shooter. He won the gold medal in the 50 m pistol at the 2016 South Asian Games at Guwahati. He also won a bronze medal as a member of the Bangladesh team in that event. He is a member of Bangladesh Army services team.

In junior level, he won a bronze medal in the 10-meter Air Pistol Junior Group in the 8th Asian Air Gun Shooting Championship held in New Delhi.

See also

 Imam Hossain
 Sharmin Ratna

References

Living people
Bangladeshi male sport shooters
Shooters at the 2018 Commonwealth Games
Commonwealth Games silver medallists for Bangladesh
Commonwealth Games medallists in shooting
Shooters at the 2018 Asian Games
South Asian Games gold medalists for Bangladesh
Asian Games competitors for Bangladesh
1995 births
South Asian Games medalists in shooting
Medallists at the 2018 Commonwealth Games